Future Oncology is a peer-reviewed medical journal established in 2005 and published by Future Medicine. It covers all aspects of oncology. The editors-in-chief are Ron Allison (21st Century Oncology) and Jackson Orem (Uganda Cancer Institute).

Abstracting and indexing
The journal is abstracted and indexed in CINAHL Plus, Chemical Abstracts, Current Contents/Clinical Medicine, EMBASE/Excerpta Medica, Index Medicus/MEDLINE/PubMed, Science Citation Index Expanded, and Scopus. According to the Journal Citation Reports, the journal has a 2016 impact factor of 2.131, ranking it 152nd out of 217 journals in the category "Oncology".

References

External links 
 

English-language journals
Oncology journals
Publications established in 2005
Future Science Group academic journals
Journals published between 27 and 51 times per year